The Lowe River is a  long river in Alaska. It begins at glacier known as Deserted Glacier in the Chugach Mountains, passes through Keystone Canyon and flows into Prince William Sound near Valdez.  It was named by William R. Abercrombie in honor of Lt. Perceval Lowe, a member of an exploratory mission in the area led by Abercrombie.

References

Rivers of Alaska